Spasm is a sudden, involuntary contraction of a muscle, a group of muscles or a hollow organ.

Spasm may also refer to:

 "Spasm" (song), by Peach, 1993
 "Spasm", a song by Dave's True Story
 "Spasm", a song by David Kilgour from Here Come the Cars
 "Spasm", a song by Meshuggah from Nothing
 "Spasm", a song by Scorn from Vae Solis
 Spasms (film), a 1983 film by William Fruet
 SPASM: Virtual Reality, Android Music and Electric Flesh, a 1993 book by Arthur Kroker

See also
 
 
 Spasmo, a 1974 film by Umberto Lenzi